Rozzano is a comune in the Metropolitan City of Milan, Lombardy, Italy.

It may also refer to:
Rozzano Rufino Biazon (born 1969), Filipino politician
Rozzano D. Briguez (born 1964), Filipino general
Rozzano Locsin (born 1954), Filipino–American professor

Masculine given names
Filipino masculine given names